Nagarkot is a former Village Development Committee located 32 km east of Kathmandu, Nepal in Bhaktapur District in Bagmati Province and as of 2015 part of Nagarkot Municipality. At the time of the 2011 census it had a population of 4,571 and had 973 houses in it. At an elevation of 2,195 meters, it is considered one of the most scenic spots in Bhaktapur District. It is known for a sunrise view of the Himalayas including Mount Everest as well as other peaks of the Himalayan range of eastern Nepal. Nagarkot also offers a panoramic view of the Kathmandu Valley. The scenic beauty of the place makes it a very popular hiking route for tourists. It is located approximately 7000 ft (2000 m) above sea level and 28 km from Kathmandu International Airport.

Nagarkot commands one of the broadest views of the Himalayas in the Kathmandu valley (8 Himalayan ranges of Nepal out of 13 from here). The ranges include Annapurna range, Manaslu range, Ganesh himal range, Langtang range, Jugal range, Rolwaling range, Mahalangur range (Everest range) and Numbur range with views of the Kathmandu valley and Shivapuri National Park.

For those active nature lovers and outdoor enthusiasts, there are many hiking opportunities in and around Nagarkot. Among them, Nagarkot eco trail (nature walk) along with Nagarkot panoramic hiking trail is the most popular ones. You can also do Paragliding with Everest view in Nagarkot.

Situated in a strategic location, Nagarkot was an ancient fort of the Kathmandu valley built to monitor the external activities of other kingdoms. Later, it became a summer retreat for the royal family before becoming popular as an international hill station.

Lots of Homestay also offer for tourists or travellers as a hospitality industry like GoGreek Kattike Resort & Homestay, Kattike Bhanjyang Shankharapur-3 Nagarkot.

Gallery

References

External links

Populated places in Bhaktapur District
Himalayas
Hill stations in Nepal